Robert Lambert (1 August 1896 – 9 September 1970) was an Irish politician. He was involved in the Irish War of Independence fighting on the republican side and led the Kyle Flying Column.

He was elected to Dáil Éireann as a Sinn Féin Teachta Dála (TD) for the Wexford constituency at the 1923 general election. He did not take his seat in the Dáil due to Sinn Féin's abstentionist policy. He did not contest the June 1927 general election.

References

Early Sinn Féin TDs
Members of the 4th Dáil
Politicians from County Wexford
1896 births
1970 deaths